Making Sandwiches is a short film written and directed by American actress and producer Sandra Bullock.

Cast
 Sandra Bullock as Melba Club
 Matthew McConaughey as Bud Hoagie
 Eric Roberts as Julia
 Beth Grant as Mrs. Hellman

Production
The short film was shot in Ventura, California in 1996, and debuted at the 1997 Sundance Film Festival, and also played the Austin Film Festival in 1998.

References

External links
 
 

1998 films
1998 short films
American short films
Films directed by Sandra Bullock
Films produced by Sandra Bullock
Films shot in California
1990s English-language films